Sergij Gorbenko (born July 30, 1985) is a Ukrainian professional basketball player for Budivelnyk Kyiv of the UA SuperLeague.

Professional career
On September 17, 2015, Gorbenko signed a contract with BC Budivelnyk.

External links
 FIBA Europe
 Sergiy Gorbenko at basketball.eurobasket.com

References 

1985 births
Living people
BC Budivelnyk players
Ukrainian men's basketball players
BC Kyiv players
BC Dnipro-Azot players
Forwards (basketball)
Sportspeople from Mykolaiv
21st-century Ukrainian people